International Centre of Technology (ICT) is a college located in the outskirts of Thika in the Central Province of Kenya. The college was established in January 2007 and was registered by Kenyan Ministry of Higher Education, Science and Technology in 2011.
Registration No. MOHEST/PC/1405/011

The college is accessible from Thika, Nairobi, and Matuu, about 8 km from Thika along Thika/Garissa highway in an area commonly known as Landless. It offers academic courses in Fire Fighter I, Fire Fighter II, EMT1, Paramedic, Cosmetology, Information Technology, Business, Community Development, Vocational Training, and Disaster Management.

ICT Schools and Departments
School of Emergency Medical Services
Fire Fighting Academy
School of Information Technology
School of Hospitality Management
School of Science(Occupational Health and Safety)
School of Disaster Management
School of Cosmetology
School of sports science
School of Vocational Training

Courses
Diploma/Certificate in Sales Management and Marketing
Emergency Medical Technician
Fireman 1 NFPA Qualification
Certificate in Information Technology (ICT)
Certificate/Diploma in Automotive Engineering (ICT)
Certificate in Electrical Engineering (ICT)
Diploma in Community Development and Social Work
Bridging courses
Fire and First Aid Training
Disaster Management
Cosmetology
Fire Marshall
Emergency Medical Dispatcher
Hazmart
Fire Fighter 1
Fire fFighter 2
ICT Fire & Rescue College Website

The college offers sponsorship program through Out of Afrika, a UK-registered charity and international non-governmental organization in Kenya to cater for bright students from disadvantaged backgrounds who would not normally have the chance to continue with further education due to financial restraints on the family.

International Perspective

International Centre of Technology works in collaboration with several national and international institutions to provide students with local and overseas qualifications. Due to continued expenses and a growing focus on investment in modern facilities the college seeks to expand opportunities for academic, professional qualifications and vocational skills through scientific and technological fields.

International Centre of Technology is registered with the Ministry of Education, Science and Technology as well as externally recognized bodies, which include: ICM, ABE, ABMA, City and Guilds and KNEC.

References

External links

ICT Fire & Rescue College Website
College in Kenya

Universities and colleges in Kenya
Education in Central Province (Kenya)
Educational institutions established in 2007
2007 establishments in Kenya